Sayanogorsk (Khakas: , Naa Soyan Tura) is a town in the Republic of Khakassia, Russia, located on the left bank of the Yenisei River,  south of Abakan, the capital of the republic. Population:

Geography
The town has road and water links with Abakan and Minusinsk. The town itself is located in the steppe zone.

History
Sayanogorsk was founded on November 6, 1975, in connection with the construction of the Sayan-Shushenskaya Hydroelectric Power Plant on the Yenisei River and the Sayan Aluminum Plant in the town; the latter opened ten years later.

Administrative and municipal status
Within the framework of administrative divisions, it is, together with two work settlements (Cheremushki and Mayna) and one rural locality (the village of Bogoslovka), incorporated as the Town of Sayanogorsk—an administrative unit with the status equal to that of the districts. As a municipal division, the Town of Sayanogorsk is incorporated as Sayanogorsk Urban Okrug.

Economy
Despite being a small town, Sayanogorsk is located near to the Khakas Aluminium Smelter, one of the largest aluminum smelter plants in the world. The aluminum plant provides work for the majority of the town's residents. Sayano-Shushenskaya Dam, the largest hydro-electric dam in Russia and the world's 5th-largest by installed capacity, lies to the south of the town.

Climate
Moderately sharp continental climate.
Annual precipitation: 250–300 mm. Fall mainly in the warm period.
Average temperature in July: 
Average temperature in January: 
Vegetation period: 160 days

Culture

Education
The town has ten schools, a subsidiary of KSU, a subsidiary of TUSUR, Stam, www.wtu.ru, Sayanogorsk Polytechnic College, South-Siberian Regional College.

Media

Television
In Sayanogorsk there is one local channel TV-7, on which there are broadcasts are on TV channel STS (TV Channel).

Newspapers
Sayanogorsk publishes many periodicals some are "Environment", "Sayanogorsk Courier", "Sayan statements", and "Business Sayanogorsk.

Sports
The volleyball club "Borus" is based in Sayanogorsk.

The bandy player Yevgeny Shadrin was born in Sayanogorsk.

Tourism and recreation
The Ski resort "Gladenkaya" is in Sayanogorsk.

Industry
The main industrial enterprises of the town are:
Sayan Aluminum Plant - has Production of primary aluminum and alloys on its basis
Khakas aluminum plant - has production of primary aluminum and alloys on its basis,
Plant Rusal SAYANAL - has production of aluminum foil and packing materials on its basis,
Company Stroyservice
Company Sayanstroy
Plant Sayanmoloko
and
JSC Branch Temporary Use - has the enterprise of industrial railway transport. The town is economically dependent on the Rusal-operated aluminum plant.

Energy
Sayano-Shushenskaya GES (starting the second hydraulic unit 1-December 18, 1978),
Mainsk HPS.

See also

 Sayano-Shushenskaya Dam
 2009 Sayano-Shushenskaya power station accident

External links
Unofficial website of Sayanogorsk 
Pictures of Sayanogorsk

References

Notes

Sources

Cities and towns in Khakassia
Populated places established in 1975
1975 establishments in the Soviet Union
Populated places on the Yenisei River